Live in San Francisco is a live album by the American garage rock band Thee Oh Sees, released on July 1, 2016 as part of the Live in San Francisco series by Castle Face Records. The vinyl release is accompanied by a DVD of the performances, filmed by Brian Lee Hughes.

The album was recorded over three nights in July 2015 at The Chapel, in San Francisco, during the band's tour in support of its sixteenth studio album, Mutilator Defeated at Last, and marks the first release to feature drummers Ryan Moutinho and Dan Rincon.

The track, "Gelatinous Cube", subsequently appeared on the band's next studio album, A Weird Exits.

Track listing

References

2016 live albums
Oh Sees albums
Castle Face Records albums